Domenic Mobilio (January 14, 1969 – November 13, 2004) was a Canadian professional soccer player who played as a striker.

Club career

Born in Vancouver, British Columbia, Mobilio was a long-time member of the Vancouver 86ers turned Vancouver Whitecaps. He played 14 seasons beginning with the team in the Canadian Soccer League, later joining the American Professional Soccer League, before finishing up a Whitecap. He retired from the professional outdoor game in 2001.

Although Mobilio had trials overseas, most notably in Scotland (he played two Scottish Premier Division games in the 93/94 season for Dundee F.C.) and the Netherlands, he never left Vancouver. His 167 goals in 280 games is second for a player in professional soccer in Canada and the United States after the NASL's great Giorgio Chinaglia and his total of 243. He was a six time league all-star (CSL 1988, 1990, and 1991; APSL 1993 and 1996; A-League, 1997); the CSL's all-time leading scorer and 1990 top scorer and MVP. He began the 1996-1997 NPSL season with the Harrisburg Heat, but was traded to the Edmonton Drillers after seven games.

He also was a long-time pro indoor soccer player, being named MISL Newcomer of the Year for 1989 playing for the Baltimore Blast. He played with the Blast until 1992. Mobilio also played in the National Professional Soccer League with the Philadelphia Kixx and the Detroit Rockers.

International career 
Mobilio was a member of the Canadian U-20 team which competed at the 1987 FIFA World Youth Championship and that won the gold medal in the 1989 Jeux de la Francophonie.

He made his senior debut for Canada in a January 1986 friendly match against Paraguay and went on to earn 25 caps. Mobilio scored three goals, all coming in a nearly successful qualifying campaign for the 1994 FIFA World Cup finals.

His final international was a November 1997 World Cup qualification match against the USA.

Coaching career 
Upon retirement, Mobilio worked as a technical director with the Coquitlam City Soccer Association and became a coach of youth soccer in Coquitlam.

Personal life and death
Mobilio attended high school at Templeton Secondary School in East Vancouver, graduating in 1987. He was not only a prolific soccer player at Templeton but also, a star basketball player.

His cousin Melissa Mobilio played for Vancouver Whitecaps Women and the Trinity Western Spartans.

Mobilio died in 2004 at age 35 of a sudden and massive heart attack, suffered while driving from a friend's house in Burnaby after playing a game of amateur soccer. Friends and relatives then established a foundation in his memory to fund various soccer associations to allow under privileged children an opportunity to enjoy the sport.

Career statistics 
Scores and results list Canada's goal tally first.

Honours
Mobilio was inducted into the Canadian Soccer Hall of Fame in 2006. He was inducted in the Baltimore Blast Hall of Fame on February 16, 2008.

External links 
 / Canada Soccer Hall of Fame

Dominic Mobilio Tributes at Coquitlam MFSC
Tribute and Bio - USL Soccer

References

1969 births
2004 deaths
American Professional Soccer League players
Soccer players from Vancouver
People from Coquitlam
Canadian people of Italian descent
Association football forwards
Canadian soccer players
Canada men's international soccer players
Canada men's youth international soccer players
Canadian expatriate soccer players
Canadian expatriate sportspeople in the United States
Vancouver Whitecaps (1986–2010) players
Baltimore Blast (1980–1992) players
Dundee F.C. players
Harrisburg Heat (NPSL) players
Edmonton Drillers (1996–2000) players
Philadelphia KiXX (NPSL) players
Detroit Rockers players
Major Indoor Soccer League (1978–1992) players
Scottish Football League players
Major Soccer League players
National Professional Soccer League (1984–2001) players
USL First Division players
Expatriate soccer players in the United States
Expatriate footballers in Scotland
Canada Soccer Hall of Fame inductees
1993 CONCACAF Gold Cup players
Canadian expatriate sportspeople in Scotland